Galeolaria is a genus of coastal tube-building annelid fanworms in the family Serpulidae, found from southern Queensland, to New Zealand and southern Australian shores, to Western Australia.

Description
The body is symmetrical, with a branchial crown made up of two lobes, one holding a stalked operculum. The operculum is winged with spines. The operculum seals the tube when the animal retreats into its tube. The tentacles of the branchial crown are used as gills and as a way of capturing food.

Galeolaria build and live within white to grey calcareous tubes, up to 3 cm in length. These tubes may be found singly or in complex interwoven colonies, forming a distinctive zone at the mid tidal regions. They may be so thick and dense that they form a microhabitat for many other creatures. When expose to air at low tide, these animals retreat within their tubes.

Habitat
A distinctive zone-forming species with its upper limit at the lowest neap water high-water mark. Isolated tubes may be found at any level, even above the highest tide, only being wetted by spray.

Species
The genus contains two described species:

 Galeolaria caespitosa Lamarck, 1818
 Galeolaria hystrix Mörch, 1863

References

 Bennett, I. (1987) W.J. Dakin's classic study: Australian Seashores. p. 194-5, Angus & Robertson, Sydney.
 Davey, K. (1998) A Photographic Guide to Seashore Life of Australia. p. 38, New Holland, Sydney.
 Edgar, G.J. (1997) Australian Marine Life: the plants and animals of temperate waters. p. 162, Reed Books, Kew.
 Quinn, G.P., Wescott, G.C. & Synnot, R.N. (1992) Life on the Rocky Shores of South-Eastern Australia: an illustrated field guide. p. 33, Victorian National Parks Association, Melbourne.
 Shepherd, S.A. & Thomas, I.M. (1982) Marine Invertebrates of Victoria, Pt. 1. p. 291, South Australian Government Printer, Adelaide.
 Underwood, A.J. & Chapman, M.G. (1993) Seashores: a beachcomber's guide. p. 38, New South Wales University Press, Sydney.

Serpulidae
Polychaete genera